Johannes Torpe is a Danish designer, musician, producer, and former creative director of Bang & Olufsen (2011-2015). He has been the CEO and creative director of the design company Johannes Torpe Studios based in Copenhagen, Denmark.

In 2000, Torpe and his half-brother, musician and DJ Reilly Kölsch (known as Rune RK) formed the music production duo Artificial Funk. Torpe and Kölsch released a remix of the song "Calabria" featuring Danish reggae singer Natasja Saad under the name Enur in 2007. "Calabria 2007" entered the music charts in many countries and reached number one on the Billboard Hot Dance Airplay chart.

As a designer, Torpe works within the fields of interior design, product design, industrial design and architecture. He has worked with a number of international companies such as Roberto Cavalli, Dolce & Gabbana, Hay, and Skype. In 2017, Torpe ventured into architecture releasing his first project, a hotel and spa facility in Iceland.

Notable projects 
 NASA nightclub, Copenhagen, Denmark (1997)
 Supergeil, Copenhagen, Denmark (2001)
 Mormor Sofa by HAY (2007)
 SUBU, Beijing, China (2008) 
 South Beauty Group, Taipei, Taiwan (2012)
 Space Enabler for Haworth, USA (2011) 
 Bang & Olufsen Global Retail Store Concept (2013)  
 Palæo Primal Gastronomy, Copenhagen, Denmark (2015)
 Nike office brand installations, Beijing, China (2015)
 Levi Restaurant, Copenhagen, Denmark (2022)

Awards 
 2018: Mipim / Architectural Review Future Project Awards - the Red Mountain Resort received a commendation in the Retail & Leisure category
 2012: Restaurant & Bar Design Awards - South Beauty Taipei was nominated in the category Best International Restaurant
 2007: Danish Design Award, for the sofa 'Mormor', designed together with Rune Reilly Kølsch and produced by Hay

References

External links
Official
Johannes Torpe at Design Indaba

Danish designers
Danish musicians
Danish male artists
Designers from Copenhagen
People from Skanderborg Municipality